Bale may refer to:

Packaging 
 Cotton bale
 Hay or straw bale in farming, bound by a baler
 Paper bale, a unit of paper measurement equal to ten reams
 Wool bale, a standard-sized and -weighted pack of classed wool

Places 
 Bale Zone in Oromia Region, Ethiopia
 Bale Mountains
 Bale Province, Ethiopia, a former province
 Sultanate of Bale, a former Muslim sultanate
 Bale, Poland
 Bale, Konjic, Bosnia and Herzegovina, a village
 Bale, Croatia, a settlement and municipality
 Bale, Norfolk, England, a village
 Balé Province, Burkina Faso
 Basel, Switzerland, a city whose French name is Bâle

Other uses
 Bale (name), a list of people with that name
 Bale baronets, an extinct title in the Baronetage of England
 Bail (jewelry), also spelled bale, a component of certain types of jewelry, mostly necklaces
 A variant breed or type of Abyssinian horse

See also 
 Bale shrew, a species endemic to the Bale Mountains of Ethiopia
 Akar-Bale language
 Ba'al
 Bail (disambiguation)
 Bales
 Baale (disambiguation)